Things is a 1984 role-playing game supplement for Chill published by Pacesetter.

Contents
Things is a book which contains descriptions and game statistics for more than 50 new creatures from "the Unknown," along with stats for 17 more animals that occult investigators might encounter.

Reception
William A. Barton reviewed Things in Space Gamer No. 71. Barton commented that "Things is a book no Chillmaster should be without (likewise any Chill player who wishes a long life for his or her character).  GMs of other supernatural RPGs such as Stalking the Night Fantastic could probably make good use of at least some of the information in Things, too."

Reviews
Adventurers Club #6 (Winter, 1984 Digest)
 Casus Belli #38 (June 1987)

References

Chill (role-playing game) supplements
Role-playing game supplements introduced in 1984